Parbold is a village and civil parish in West Lancashire, England.

Local government
Parbold had a population of 2,582 at the 2011 Census.

West Lancashire is divided into 19 parish councils, the first tier of local government. Parbold is bordered by Hilldale to the north, Wrightington to the east, Dalton to the south and Newburgh to the west.

From 1894 to 1974 Parbold was part of the Wigan Rural District, along with Dalton, Haigh, Shevington, Worthington and Wrightington.

Location
Parbold lies in the valley of the River Douglas, at the bottom of the western side of Parbold Hill.

The village can also be reached by rail on the line from Manchester to Southport. Close to the village centre the Leeds and Liverpool Canal passes over the River Douglas. The nearest sizable towns are Skelmersdale (about 5 miles away), Ormskirk (7 miles), and Wigan (9 miles).

The village is dominated by Parbold Hill which rises to 400 feet above sea level, the top of which is approximately 1 mile to the east of the village. The top of the hill overlooks the West Lancashire plain and the North West of England across to Liverpool, Manchester and Wales. Wood Lane, just off the main road, is also known for its views of the surrounding countryside.

History

The earliest known reference to Parbold is in the late 12th century, where grants of land were made to nearby Burscough Priory (pronounced Bursk-owe).  After the Norman conquest, Parbold was part of the Barony of Manchester. Little development occurred from this time to the mid 18th century. Parbold became a civil parish in 1894.

During the 18th and 19th centuries, a number of coal mines worked nearby, rather meagre, seams; hard sandstone was also quarried. Both coal and sandstone could be exported over the waterways; boatbuilding was a minor economic activity in Parbold around this time. The old windmill that is located next to the canal replaced an earlier water cornmill which once stood on Alder Lane, and was in use until 1985.

Parbold railway station, built in the mid 19th century by the Lancashire and Yorkshire Railway, radically altered the village; it allowed middle class workers to live in Parbold and commute to urban areas throughout the north-west. In recent years a direct hourly service has operated to Manchester Airport railway station giving quick access (less than 1 hour and 15 minutes journey time) to flights from Manchester Airport. The railway station also provided a natural centre for the village which it still is today.

Parbold's war memorial is in the local Anglican church, Christ Church, near the top of Parbold Hill. The village's other church – Our Lady and All Saints – was consecrated by Bishop Robert Cornthwaite on 28 May 1884.

Composer Hugh Wood (1932-2021) was born in Parbold.

Amenities
Parbold has two churches, two primary schools and a nursery, a library built in 1989, a purpose-built village hall which doubles as a cinema and community centre, a telephone exchange, a doctor's surgery, a sub post office and a number of other shops including a pharmacy, a newsagent, an estate agent, three hairdressers and both Chinese and Indian takeaways plus a greengrocery. There are two pubs along the main road through the centre of the village – the Windmill and the Stocks Tavern. Along with a branch of the Miller and Carter Steakhouse at the top of the hill and the Wayfarer: Brew Pub and Dining Rooms providing Al A Carte and Italian style foods. The windmill in the village was built in 1794 but has not milled since about 1850 and is now a gallery for James Bartholomew.

Sport
Parbold's former local amateur football team, Parbold FC, plays in the South Lancashire Counties League. In 2005-06, they were crowned Division 3 Champions, and promptly gained a further promotion in 2006-07 finishing runners-up of Division 2. The 2009-10 season saw Parbold crowned Division 1 Champions and they now play in the Premier League. Although the team still bears the village name, they moved to Ormskirk in 2008 and connections to the village are few.

Two semi-professional football clubs are based nearby: Skelmersdale United (Northern Premier League Division One North) and Burscough (Conference North). Shevington Sharks ARLFC youth teams train and play on the Alder Lane Playing Fields.

An annual fell race is run over Parbold Hill.

See also

Listed buildings in Parbold

References

External links

Parbold Community Website
Parbold FC
Photographs of the Leeds & Liverpool Canal at Parbold
Aerial photo of Parbold from Multimap.
Parbold Surgery

 
Villages in Lancashire
Geography of the Borough of West Lancashire
Civil parishes in Lancashire